Reda Khadra (born 4 July 2001) is a German professional footballer who plays as a midfielder for  club Birmingham City, on loan from Brighton & Hove Albion.

A youth product of Borussia Dortmund, Khadra moved to Brighton & Hove Albion in 2020, making his Premier League debut in 2021. He was loaned out to Championship side Blackburn Rovers for the 2021–22 season and fellow Championship sides Sheffield United and Birmingham City for the 2022–23 season.

Khadra has represented Germany internationally at youth level since 2018.

Early life 
Originally from Tyre, Lebanon, Khadra's parents fled the country due to the ongoing civil war and settled in Berlin, Germany. Khadra's two older sisters were born in Lebanon, while he and his brother were born in Berlin.

Club career

Borussia Dortmund 
Khadra played youth football for CFC Hertha 06 and TeBe Berlin, before joining Borussia Dortmund's youth sector in 2016. In 2017–18 Khadra played 11 games for the under-17 team, helping them win the Under 17 Bundesliga. In 2018–19 he was promoted to the under-19 team, playing 20 games in the Under 19 Bundesliga, and helping his team win the league title. Khadra also participated in the 2018–19 UEFA Youth League, playing six games. On 9 June 2019, Khadra played for the senior team in a friendly game against Energie Cottbus, scoring the first goal in a 5–0 win.

During the 2019–20 season, he contributed to nine goals in 25 games for the under-19 team, and made an appearance for the reserve team in the Regionalliga West, in a 2–0 away defeat to Rödinghausen on 7 March 2020. Khadra played six games in the 2019–20 UEFA Youth League. Between 2016 and 2020, Khadra played 69 youth team matches for Borussia Dortmund, scoring two goals and providing 11 assists. He was released in June 2020.

Brighton & Hove Albion 
On 1 October 2020, Khadra moved to Premier League side Brighton & Hove Albion, joining their Under-23 team. He made his debut for the U23s on 3 October 2020, scoring the match opener in a 3–2 away win against West Ham United. On 13 January 2021, Khadra made his Premier League debut, coming on in the 86th minute in a 1–0 away defeat to Manchester City. He picked up an injury in early February, and was ruled out for the rest of the season. Khadra signed a new contract on 13 April, until June 2023.

Loan to Blackburn Rovers 
On 31 August 2021, Khadra joined EFL Championship club Blackburn Rovers on a season-long loan deal. He made his debut on 14 September, coming on as a 54th-minute substitute for John Buckley in the 2–0 home victory over Hull City. Khadra scored his first senior goal of his career on 6 November, netting the equaliser in an eventual 3–1 home win over Sheffield United. He scored his second goal for Rovers three weeks after his first, scoring the only goal of the game in a 1–0 away win over Stoke City. Khadra scored on his FA Cup debut on 8 January 2022, putting his side 1–0 up in an eventual 3–2 third round loss to local rivals Wigan Athletic.

He had played 27 league games for Rovers, before being ruled out for the rest of a season due to a calf injury he picked up against Reading on 19 March.

Loans to Sheffield United and Birmingham City 
On 26 July 2022, Khadra joined fellow Championship club Sheffield United on loan for the 2022–23 season. He scored his only goal for United on 13 September, helping his side win 1–0 against Swansea City.

Khadra's loan to Sheffield United was cut short, and he was sent on a six-month loan to Birmingham City on 10 January 2023, also in the Championship. In addition, he signed a contract extension with Brighton until June 2024. Khadra marked his debut with a goal away to Britsol City four days later, in a 4–2 defeat.

International career 
Born in Germany, Khadra is also eligible to represent Lebanon internationally through his parents, who are from Tyre. He stated his preference to play for the Germany national team.

Khadra represented Germany internationally at under-18 level three times between 2018 and 2019, in a friendly against Cyprus and two friendlies against France. He was called-up to the under-21 squad for the first time in March 2022. However, due to an injury, Khadra withdrew from the camp. He eventually made his under-21 debut on 23 September 2022, in a 1–0 friendly defeat to France.

Style of play 
Mainly a right winger, Khadra is a versatile player also capable of playing on the left or as an attacking midfielder. His main characteristics are his pace, dribbling and finishing.

Career statistics

Club

Honours 
Borussia Dortmund
 Under 19 Bundesliga: 2018–19
 Under 17 Bundesliga: 2017–18
 Under 17 Bundesliga West: 2017–18

References

External links
 
 
 
 Reda Khadra at Premier League
 

2001 births
Living people
Footballers from Berlin
German footballers
German people of Lebanese descent
Sportspeople of Lebanese descent
Association football wingers
Association football midfielders
CFC Hertha 06 players
Tennis Borussia Berlin players
Borussia Dortmund players
Borussia Dortmund II players
Brighton & Hove Albion F.C. players
Blackburn Rovers F.C. players
Sheffield United F.C. players
Birmingham City F.C. players
Regionalliga players
Premier League players
English Football League players
Germany youth international footballers
German expatriate footballers
German expatriate sportspeople in England
Expatriate footballers in England
Germany under-21 international footballers